The Light heavyweight competition at the 2022 IBA Women's World Boxing Championships was held from 13 to 19 May 2022.

Results

References

External links
Draw

Light heavyweight